Timofey Alekseyevich Lapshin (born 3 February 1988) is a South Korean (since 2017) and Russian (until 2016) biathlete.

He debuted in the Biathlon World Cup on 9 December 2011 in Hochfilzen, Austria. He has won silver medal at Biathlon Junior World Championships.

Biathlon results
All results are sourced from the International Biathlon Union.

Olympic Games
0 medals

*The mixed relay was added as an event in 2014.

World Championships
0 medals

*During Olympic seasons competitions are only held for those events not included in the Olympic program.
**The mixed relay was added as an event in 2005.

References

External links 
IBU Profile

1988 births
Living people
Sportspeople from Krasnoyarsk
Russian male biathletes
South Korean male biathletes
Russian emigrants to South Korea
Naturalized citizens of South Korea
Biathletes at the 2018 Winter Olympics
Biathletes at the 2022 Winter Olympics
Olympic biathletes of South Korea